Within the context of Albania–Soviet Union relations, Kompania 4000 was a division trained in Germany by the United States during the Cold War. It was a group of Albanian anti-communists, mainly from Balli Kombetare and Legality Movement.

See also
Albanian Subversion
Bay of Pigs invasion
Documentary about Kompania 4000 by Top Channel

References
 
20th century in Albania